The Ishaka–Kagamba Road is a road in the Western Region of Uganda, connecting the town of Kagamba in Ntungamo District with Ishaka in Bushenyi District.

Location
The road connects traffic from Rwanda, Burundi, and southwestern Uganda, that is destined for the oil-rich Albertine graben, directly with the Mbarara-Katunguru highway. The coordinates of the road near Kitagata are 0°40'33.0"S, 30°09'18.0"E (Latitude:-0.6758; Longitude:30.1550).

Upgrading to bitumen
The government of Uganda has earmarked this road for upgrading through the conversion of the existing gravel road to bitumen surface and the building of bridges and drainage channels. CODA & Partners, a Kenyan company, designed the road. The final detailed design project report was submitted to the Uganda National Roads Authority (UNRA) in November 2010. A consortium of General Nile Company for Roads & Bridges, from Egypt, and Dott Services Limited, from Uganda, won the bid to build the road for USh 97,476,095,241. Consulting engineering and supervision services were procured from a consortium of LEA International Limited of Canada in joint venture with LEA Associates South Asia Private Limited from India in association with KOM Consult Limited  of Uganda for approximately US$2,141,850. Construction began on 6 February 2012. The road upgrade was fully funded by the government of Uganda. According to UNRA, completion is expected in December 2015. In his 2016/2017 budget speech given on 9 June 2016, the president of Uganda listed this road as "completed".

See also

 Uganda Oil Refinery
 Economy of Uganda
 Transport in Uganda
 Uganda–Kenya Crude Oil Pipeline
 List of roads in Uganda

References

External links
 How Dott Services perfected the Ishaka-Kitagata-Kagamba Road Works
 Uganda National Road Authority Homepage
  Oil Sparks Roads Upgrade

 

Roads in Uganda
Bushenyi District
Sheema District
Ntungamo District
Ankole sub-region
Western Region, Uganda
Petroleum infrastructure in Uganda